PREC may refer to:

 Puerto Rico Energy Commission, a government agency in Puerto Rico
 Processo Revolucionário Em Curso, a historical period in Portugal